The 83d Troop Carrier Squadron is an inactive United States Air Force unit.  Its last assignment was with the 437th Troop Carrier Group, based at O'Hare International Airport, Illinois.  It was inactivated on 16 November 1957.

History
Activated in May 1943 under I Troop Carrier Command and equipped with C-47 Skytrains.   Trained in various parts of the eastern United States until the end of 1943.  Deployed to England and assigned to IX Troop Carrier Command, Ninth Air Force.

Prepared for the invasion of Nazi-occupied Europe. During the Normandy campaign, the group released gliders over Cherbourg Naval Base and carried troops, weapons, ammunition, rations, and other supplies for the 82nd Airborne Division in Operation Neptune.

Deployed to Italy in July 1944 and participated in the Allied invasion of southern France in August 1944 dropping paratroops of the 1st Airborne Task Force.

During Operation Market Garden in September 1944, the group released gliders carrying troops and equipment for the airborne attack in the occupied Netherlands. In December 1944, the group re-supplied the 101st Airborne Division in the Bastogne area of Belgium during the Battle of the Bulge. After moving to France in February 1945, the unit released gliders in support of an American crossing of the Rhine River called Operation Varsity in March 1945.

Evacuated wounded personnel to rear-zone hospitals. After V-E Day, the group evacuated prisoners of war and displaced persons to relocation centers. Returned to the United States in August 1945, became a transport squadron for Continental Air Command until inactivation in November 1945.

Postwar the squadron was activated in the air force reserve in 1947 at Orchard Place Airport, Illinois, operating C-46 Commandos for Tactical Air Command Eighteenth Air Force.  Inactivated at the start of the Korean War in 1950, its aircraft and personnel being used as fillers for active duty units, then inactivated.

Reactivated as part of Far East Air Force in 1951 in Japan.  Equipped with C-119 Flying Boxcars and engaged in combat operations in the Korean Peninsula.  Dropped 2nd Ranger Infantry Company (Airborne) troops near Munsan-Ni, inactivated in June 1952 as part of a reorganization of airborne troop carrier units in Japan

Returned to reserve status, reactivated at O'Hare International Airport, Illinois in June 1952.   Inactivated in November 1957 as a result of the closure of O'Hare to military air traffic.

Operations and decorations
 Combat Operations. Airborne assaults on Normandy, southern France, the Netherlands, and Germany; relief of Bastogne; transportation of personnel and cargo in ETO and MTO during World War II, and between Japan and Korea during Korean War; airborne assault on Munsan-ni, Korea.
 Campaigns.
 World War II: Rome-Arno; Normandy; Northern France; Rhineland; Ardennes-Alsace; Central Europe.
 Korean War: First UN Counteroffensive; CCF Spring Offensive; UN Summer-Fall Offensive, Second Korean Winter, Korea Summer-Fall, 1952.
 Decorations: Distinguished Unit Citation: France, [6-7] Jun 1944. Republic of Korea Presidential Unit Citation: 1 Jul 1951-[10 Jun 1952].

Lineage
 Constituted 83d Troop Carrier Squadron on 15 Apr 1943
 Activated on 1 May 1943
 Inactivated on 15 Nov 1945
 Activated in the reserve on 3 Sep 1947
 Re-designated 83d Troop Carrier Squadron (Medium) on 27 Jun 1949
 Inactivated on 1 Aug 1950
 Activated on 26 Jan 1951
 Inactivated on 10 Jun 1952.
 Activated in the reserve on 15 June 1952
 Inactivated on 16 Nov 1957.

Assignments
 437th Troop Carrier Group, 1 May 1943-15 Nov 1945
 Second Air Force, 3 Sep 1947
 Tenth Air Force, 1 Jul 1948
 437th Troop Carrier Group, 27 Jun 1949-1 Aug 1950
 437th Troop Carrier Group, 26 Jan 1951-10 Jun 1952
 437th Troop Carrier Group, 15 Jun 1952-16 Nov 1957

Stations

 Baer Field, Indiana, 1 May 1943
 Sedalia Army Air Field, Missouri, 8 Jun 1943
 Pope Field, North Carolina, 9 Oct 1943
 Baer Field, Indiana, 31 Dec 1943-Jan 1944
 RAF Balderton (AAF-482), England, 20 Jan 1944
 RAF Ramsbury (AAF-469), England, 6 Feb 1944
 Operated from Montalto Di Castro Airfield, Italy, 19 Jul-23 Aug 1944

 Coulommiers-Voisins Airfield (A-58), France, Feb-Jul 1945
 Baer Field, Indiana, 13 Aug 1945
 Marfa Army Airfield, Texas, 14 Sep-15 Nov 1945
 Orchard Place Airport, Illinois, 3 Sep 1947-1 Aug 1950
 Tachikawa AB, Japan, 26 Jan 1951
 Brady AB, Japan, Mar-10 Jun 1952
 O'Hare International Airport, Illinois, 15 Jun 1952-16 Nov 1957

Aircraft
 C-47 Skytrain, 1943–1945, 1947-1949
 C-46 Commando, 1949–1950, 1955-1957
 C-119 Flying Boxcar, 1951-1952

References

External links 

Military units and formations established in 1943
083
083
United States Air Force units and formations in the Korean War